Parklife Music Festival was an Australian music festival held between 2000-2013 in city parks around Australia in September/October.

History 
Until 2012, Parklife was one of Australia's longest running and most popular music festivals.

Starting in 2000, Parklife was known for its diverse, eclectic and ground-breaking line-ups, bringing live acts and dj's to Melbourne, Sydney, Adelaide, Brisbane and Perth.

Headline acts played in every city but the number of stages would vary from 3-5, depending on the city.

The last Parklife Festival was in 2013, when Promoters Fuzzy announced they were retiring the brand. Organisers announced a new touring event called Listen Out (festival), a national "intelligent dance event" which toured Sydney, Perth, Melbourne and Brisbane.

Artist line-ups by years

2007 

 Adam Freeland
 Ajax
 Busy P
 Cajuan
 Craze
 Derrick Carter
 Digitalism
 Dj Delicious
 Freq Nasty Soundsystem
 Goose
 Greenskeepers
 Justice
 Kid Kenobi
 K.I.M.
 Lyrics Born
 M.I.A.
 MSTRKRFT
 Muscles
 Riot in Belgium
 Scratch Perverts
 Shapeshifter
 Stereo MCs
 The Herd
 The Sounds
 Yacht
 Yelle

2012 

 Nero Live
 Tame Impala
 Justice Dj Set
 Rusko
 The Presets
 Passion Pit
 Plan B
 Chiddy Bang
 Robyn
 Chairlift
 Dj Fresh Live
 Labyrinth
 Jacques Lu Cont
 Benga Live
 Citizens!
 Wiley
 Parachute Youth
 Jack Beats Live
 St Lucia
 Hermitude
 Art Department
 Modestep
 Charli Xcx
 Rizzle Kicks
 Lee Foss
 Flume
 Alison Wonderland

2011 

 The Gossip
 Lykke Li
 Santigold
 Adrian Lux
 Death From Above 1979
 Duck Sauce
 Katy B
 The Naked & Famous
 Crystal Fighters
 Digitalism
 Diplo
 Duck Sauce
 Example
 The Streets
 Simian Mobile Disco
 Magnetic Man
 Nero
 SebastiAn
 Mstrkrft
 Sebastien Tellier
 Little Dragon
 Gold Fields
 Mylo
 Wolfgang Gartner
 Joker & MC Nomad
 Feed Me
 Tensnake
 Kimbra
 Albert Salt
 The Aston Shuffle
 Flux Pavilion
 Yacht Club DJs
 Harvard Bass

References 

Music festivals in Australia